The 1987 Grand Prix Brno was the sixth round of the inaugural World Touring Car Championship. The race was held for cars eligible for Group A touring car regulations. It was held on August 16, 1987, at the Masaryk Circuit, in Brno, Czechoslovakia.

The race was won by the Eggenberger Motorsport pairing of Klaus Ludwig and Klaus Niedzwiedz. They drove the newly homologated Ford Sierra RS500, which proved much faster and far more reliable than the Ford Sierra RS Cosworths the team had been using to that point of the season.

Class structure
Cars were divided into three classes based on engine capacity:
 Division 1: 1-1600cc
 Division 2: 1601-2500cc
 Division 3: Over 2500cc

Official results
Results were as follows:

 Drivers in italics practiced in the car but did not take part in the race.

See also
 1987 World Touring Car Championship

References

1987 World Touring Car Championship season